Bryce Quigley (born June 26, 1992) is an American football offensive tackle who is currently a free agent. He was signed as an undrafted free agent by the Detroit Lions in 2014. He played college football at San Diego State University.

High school career
Quigley played high school football, basketball, and golf for Granite Hills High School in Apple Valley, California.

College career
Quigley played college football for the San Diego State Aztecs of the Mountain West Conference. He began his career as a tight end, but became a lineman in his junior year. He won All-Conference honorable mention for both of his final two years at San Diego State.

Professional career

Detroit Lions
Due to a late college season foot injury and surgery Quigley was not selected in the 2014 NFL draft. In June 2014, after a tryout and medical clearance, he was signed as an undrafted free agent by the Detroit Lions. He was released by the Lions on August 26, 2014.

San Diego Chargers
Quigley was signed to the San Diego Chargers' practice squad on December 4, 2014. He was waived on May 19, 2015.

Washington Redskins
Quigley signed with the Washington Redskins on June 9, 2015. He was waived on August 31, 2015.

Kimley-Horn
He lives in the Phoenix, Arizona Area focusing on his career in land development since 2016. He is currently a civil analyst at Kimley-Horn and Associates, Inc., a national multi-disciplinary consulting and design firm in land use, urban planning, civil engineering, traffic/transportation planning, as well as landscape architecture. He designs and lays out new communities and development projects throughout Arizona and in other parts of the world.

References

External links
San Diego State Aztecs

1992 births
Living people
Players of American football from California
American football offensive tackles
San Diego State Aztecs football players
Sportspeople from San Bernardino County, California
People from Apple Valley, California